Paoli Municipal Airport (I42) is a public airport  north of Paoli, in Orange County, Indiana. The airport was founded in July 1947.

References

External links 

Airports in Indiana
Transportation buildings and structures in Orange County, Indiana